The following is a list of Huawei phones. The date in brackets is the date of initial release.

Huawei's two flagship smartphone lines are the P and Mate series.

Ascend series

Ascend D series
 Huawei Ascend D Quad XL
 Huawei Ascend D1 (2012, discontinued)
 Huawei Ascend D1 Quad (2012, discontinued)
 Huawei Ascend D2 (2013, discontinued)
 Huawei Ascend D3 (Mate 3) (2014)

Ascend G series
List of G series phones (discontinued)
 Huawei Ascend G300 (2012, discontinued)
 Huawei Ascend G312 (2012, discontinued)
 Huawei Ascend G33 (2012, discontinued)
 Huawei Ascend G510-0010 (2013, discontinued)
 Huawei Ascend G525 (2013, discontinued)
 Huawei Ascend G526 (2013, discontinued)
 Huawei Ascend G535 (2014)
 Huawei Ascend g750 u10 (2012, discontinued)
 Huawei Ascend G610 (2013, discontinued)
 Huawei Ascend G615 (2013, discontinued)
 Huawei Ascend G620s (2014)
 Huawei Ascend G630 (2014)
 Huawei Ascend G7 (2014)
 Huawei Ascend G700 (2013, discontinued)
 Huawei Ascend G740 (2013, discontinued)

Ascend Mate series/Mate series

 Huawei Ascend Mate (2013)
 Huawei Ascend Mate 2 (4G) (2014)
 Huawei Ascend Mate 7
 Huawei Mate S (2015)
 Huawei Mate SE (2017)
 Huawei Mate 8 (2015)
 Huawei Mate 9 (2016)
 Huawei Mate 9 Lite (also called Honor 6X)
 Huawei Mate 9 Pro (2016)
 Huawei Porsche Design Mate 9
 Huawei Mate 10 (2017)
 Huawei Mate 10 Pro (2017)
 Huawei Mate 10 Lite [also known as Huawei Nova 2i or Huawei Maimang 6 or Honor 9i (in India)] (2017)
 Huawei Porsche Design Mate 10 (2017)
 Huawei Porsche Design Mate RS (2018)
 Huawei Mate 20 (2018)
 Huawei Mate 20 Pro (2018)
 Huawei Mate 20 Lite (2018)
 Huawei Mate 20 X (2018)
 Huawei Mate 20 Porsche RS (2018)
 Huawei Mate X (2019)
 Huawei Mate 30 (2019)
 Huawei Mate 30 Pro (2019)
 Huawei Mate 30 (5G) (2019)
 Huawei Mate 30 Pro (5G) (2019)
Huawei Mate 30E Pro 5G (2020)
 Huawei Mate 30 RS (2019)
 Huawei MatePad Pro (2019)
 Huawei Mate Xs (2020)
 Huawei mate Xs2 (2022)
 Huawei Mate 40 (2020)
Huawei Mate 40 Pro (2020)
Huawei Mate 40 Pro+ (2020)
 Huawei Mate 40 RS (2020)
 Huawei Mate 40E (2021)
Huawei Mate 40E 4G (2021)
Huawei Mate 40 Pro 4G (2021)
 Huawei Mate 50 (2022)
 Huawei Mate 50 Pro (2022)
 Huawei Mate 50 RS Porsche Design (2022)
 Huawei Mate X2 (2021)
Huawei Mate X2 4G (2021)

Ascend P series/P series

 Huawei Ascend P1 (2012, discontinued)
 Huawei Ascend P1 LTE (2012, discontinued)
 Huawei Ascend P1 S (2012, discontinued)
 Huawei Ascend P1 XL (2012, discontinued)
 Huawei Ascend P2 (2013, discontinued)
 Huawei Ascend P6 (2013, discontinued)
 Huawei Ascend P7 (2014)
 Huawei Ascend P7 Mini (2014, discontinued)
 Huawei Ascend P7 Sapphire Edition (2014)
 Huawei P8 (2015)
 Huawei P8 Max (2015)
 Huawei P8 Lite (2015)
 Huawei P8 Lite (Honor 8 Lite / P9 Lite 2017 / Nova Lite / GR3 2017) (2017)
 Huawei P9 (2016)
 Huawei P9 Lite (Huawei G9) (2016)
 Huawei P9 Lite Mini (2017) (Nova Lite 2017)
 Huawei P9 Plus (2016)
 Huawei P10 (2017)
 Huawei P10 Plus (2017)
 Huawei P10 Lite (Nova Youth) (2017)
 Huawei P Smart (2017)
 Huawei P Smart Pro (2018)
 Huawei P20 (2018)
 Huawei P20 Pro (2018)
 Huawei P20 Lite (also called Nova 3e) 
 Huawei P Smart + (Nova 3i)
 Huawei P Smart (2019)
 Huawei P Smart Z (2019)
 Huawei P30 (2019)
 Huawei P30 Pro (2019)
 Huawei P30 Lite (2019) (known as Nova 4e)
 Huawei P30 New Edition (2020)
 Huawei P30 Lite New Edition (2020)
 Huawei P Smart (2020)
 Huawei P Smart S (2020) (known as Enjoy 10s / Y8p)
 Huawei P40 (2020)
 Huawei P40 Lite (2020) (known as Nova 6 SE / Nova 7i)
 Huawei P40 Lite E (2020) (known as Y7p)
 Huawei P40 Pro (2020)
 Huawei P40 Pro+ (2020)
 Huawei P40 Lite 5G (2020) (known as Nova 7 SE)
 Huawei P40 4G (2021)
 Huawei P Smart 2021 (2020) (known as Y7a, models PPA-LX1 and PPA-LX2)
Huawei P50 (2021)
 Huawei P50 Pro (2021)
 Huawei P50 Pocket (2021)
 Huawei P50E (2022)

Ascend W series 
List of W series phones (discontinued)
 Huawei Ascend W1 (2013)
 Huawei Ascend W2 (2013)

Ascend Y series 
List of Ascend Y series phones (discontinued)
 Huawei Ascend Y (2012)
 Huawei Ascend Y100 (2012)
 Huawei Ascend Y200 (2012)
 Huawei Ascend Y201
 Huawei Ascend Y201 Pro (2012)
 Huawei Ascend Y210D (2013)
 Huawei Ascend Y220 (2014)
 Huawei Ascend Y221 (2014)
 Huawei Ascend Y300 (2013)
 Huawei Y300II (2014)
 Huawei Ascend Y320 (2013)
 Huawei Ascend Y321
 Huawei Ascend Y330 (2014)
 Huawei Ascend Y511 (2013)
 Huawei Ascend Y520 (2014)
 Huawei Ascend Y530 (2014)
 Huawei Ascend Y540 (2015)
 Huawei Ascend Y550 (2014)
 Huawei Y635 (2015)

Nova series 
The Nova series is aimed at mobile selfie enthusiasts

List of Nova series phones

Ascend GX series 
List of Ascend GX series phones
 Huawei Ascend GX (2014)
 Huawei Ascend GX-2 
 Huawei Ascend GX-3
 Huawei Ascend GX-4
 Huawei Ascend GX-5
 Huawei Ascend GX-6
 Huawei Ascend GX-7
 Huawei Ascend GX-8
 Huawei Ascend GX-9

G series 
List of G series phones

 Huawei G8 (G7 Plus in China) (2015)
 Huawei G9 Lite (P9 Lite) (2016)
 Huawei G9 Plus (2016, the Chinese version of Huawei Nova Plus)
 Huawei GR3
 Huawei GR5 (known as Honor 5X)
 Huawei GR5 2017 (known as Honor 6X)
 Huawei GR3 2017
 Huawei GT3 (known as GR5 mini, Honor 5c and Honor 7 Lite)

T Series
List of T series phones (discontinued)

 Huawei T120
 Huawei T161L 
 Huawei T156 
 Huawei T158 
 Huawei T201 
 Huawei T208 
 Huawei T211 
 Huawei T261L
 Huawei T330
 Huawei T552

U Series
List of U series phones (discontinued)

 Huawei U1000
 Huawei U1100
 Huawei U1270
 Huawei U3300
 Huawei U7310
 Huawei U7510
 Huawei U8100
 Huawei U8110
 Huawei U9130 Compass
 Huawei U9150

Y series 
List of Y series phones (discontinued)

Honor series (former sub-brand of Huawei) 
The appeal of Honor, formerly a sub-brand in Huawei's broader smartphone portfolio aimed at the youth market, is that it packs many of the advanced features of the company's premium line of Huawei-brand phones at significantly lower cost.

 Honor (Huawei U8860) (2011)
 Honor 2 (Huawei U9508) (2012)
 Honor 3 outdoor (2013)
 Honor 3C (2013)
 Honor 3X (2013)
Honor 3C 4G (2014)
Honor 3C Play (2014)
Honor 4X (2014)
Honor 4C (2015)
 Honor 4A (2015)
 Honor 5X (2015)
 Honor 6 (2014)
 Honor 6 Plus (2014)
 Honor 6X (2016)
 Honor 7 (2015)
 Honor 7A (2018)
 Honor 7i (2015)
 Honor 7X (2017)
 Honor 7C (2018)
 Honor 7S (Also Honor Play 7) (2018)
 Honor 8 (2016)
 Honor 8 Lite (2017)
 Honor V8 (2016)
 Honor 8 Pro (also called Honor V9 in China) (2017)
 Honor 9 (2017)
 Honor 9 Lite (2017)
 Honor 9i (a.k.a. Honor 9n in India) (2018)
 Honor 9i (for India) (a.k.a. Huawei Mate 10 Lite, Maimang 6, Nova 2i)
 Honor View 10 (2017) (also called Honor V10 in China)
 Honor View 20 (2018) (also called Honor V20 in China)
Honor View 30 (2019) (also called Honor V30 in China)
Honor View 30 Pro (2019) (also called Honor V30 Pro in China)
 Honor 10 (2018)
 Honor 10 GT (2018)
 Honor 10 Lite (2018)
Honor 20 (2019)
Honor 20 Pro (2019)
Honor 20 Lite (2019)
Honor 30 (2020)
Honor 30 Pro (2020)
Honor 30 Pro+ (2020)
Honor 30S (2020)
Honor 30 Lite (2020)
Honor 30i (2020)
 Honor Play (2018)
Honor Play 3 (2019)
Honor Play 3e (2019)
Honor Play 4 (2020)
Honor Play 4 Pro (2020)
Honor Play 4T (2020)
Honor Play 4T Pro (2020)
 Honor Note 10 (2018)
 Honor 8X (2018)
 Honor 8X Max (2018)
 Honor 8C (2018)
 Honor Magic (2016)
 Honor Magic 2 (2018)
 Honor 8A (2019)
 Honor X10 (2020)
Honor X10 Max (2020)
Honor 10X Lite (2020)

Enjoy series 
The Huawei Enjoy series is a series of phones sold exclusively in China. The Enjoy series actually encompasses many different phones from other Huawei phone series, primarily the Huawei Y series, however it also has phones from the Honor sub-brand and the P series. The Enjoy series phones are completely identical to the phones they reflect in other series, with the only difference being software (Chinese ROM) and branding.

There is only one phone exclusive to the Enjoy series:

See also
Motorola Moto#Smartphones
Samsung Galaxy#Phones
Products of Xiaomi#Smartphones
List of iOS devices#iPhone
List of LG mobile phones

References 

 

 
Huawei